Kamiel Van Dooren (born 25 October 1936) is a Belgian rower. He competed in the men's coxed pair event at the 1952 Summer Olympics.

References

1936 births
Living people
Belgian male rowers
Olympic rowers of Belgium
Rowers at the 1952 Summer Olympics
Sportspeople from Antwerp